Parent article: List of tornadoes and tornado outbreaks
These are some notable tornadoes, tornado outbreaks, and tornado outbreak sequences that have occurred in Europe.

Pre-20th century

20th century

21st century

See also 
 List of F5 and EF5 tornadoes
 List of F4 and EF4 tornadoes
 List of F4 and EF4 tornadoes (2020–present)
 List of European tornadoes in 2010
 List of European tornadoes in 2011
 List of European tornadoes in 2012
 List of European tornadoes in 2013
 List of European tornadoes in 2014
 List of European tornadoes in 2022
 List of tornadoes striking downtown areas
 List of tornadoes rated on the International Fujita scale

References 

 Grazulis, Thomas P. (1993). Significant Tornadoes 1680–1991, A Chronology and Analysis of Events. St. Johnsbury, VT: The Tornado Project of Environmental Films. 
 Grazulis, Thomas P. (2001). The Tornado: Nature's Ultimate Windstorm. Norman, OK: University of Oklahoma Press.

Further reading

External links 
UK Weather Forecast
 European Severe Storms Laboratory (ESSL)
 European Severe Weather Database (ESWD)
 European Storm Forecast Experiment (ESTOFEX)
 Tornado Map *in German
 Swiss Severe Weather Database (SSWD) / Sturmarchiv Schweiz *in German
 Tornadoes at the Czech Republic and Slovakia (Czech version) (Czech Hydrometeorological Institute)
 Tornadoliste Deutschland *in German
 Tornadoes of Europe
 

Tornadoes and tornado outbreaks
Tornado-related lists